John Clarke was an English politician in the 17th century.

Clarke was born in London and lived at Hurtmore.  In later life he moved to Battle, Sussex.

References

People from London
16th-century English people
English MPs 1601
17th-century English people